Una Stella Abrahamson ( Golding; August 6, 1922 – February 28, 1999) was an English-born Canadian artist and writer.

Biography 
She was born Una Stella Golding in London and studied art in England. She married Roy Abrahamson shortly after World War II ended in 1945 and came to Canada the next year. She apprenticed as a painter with Henri Masson. She later worked as an economist and as domestic historian for the test kitchens at Chatelaine magazine. She was also a publicist for the kitchens of General Foods and later as director of Consumer Affairs for the Dominion chain of supermarkets. 

In 1975, Abrahamson was chair of the Ontario Council of Health's task force on dietetics and nutrition. In October 1976, she was hit by a car in Toronto. After staying in a coma for over a year and going through a subsequent long recovery period, she regained the ability to speak and write. She died in 1999 in Toronto at the age of 76.

Legacy 
She was the author of God Bless Our Home: Domestic Life in Nineteenth Century Canada (1966), The Canadian Guide to Home Entertaining (1974) and Crafts Canada (1975).

The large collection of cookbooks that she accumulated over her life were donated to the University of Guelph as the Una Abrahamson Canadian Cookery Collection.

References 

1922 births
1999 deaths
Artists from London
Artists from Toronto
British emigrants to Canada
Canadian food writers
Canadian women painters
Canadian women non-fiction writers
Writers from London
Writers from Toronto
20th-century Canadian women artists